Christopher Wilson (born October 27, 1992), better known by his stage name Riot Ten, is an American DJ and producer based in El Paso, Texas. He is best known for his dubstep and hardtrap production and is currently signed to Steve Aoki's Dim Mak, with additional music out on Excision's Rotten Recordings, Never Say Die Records, Disciple Records, and Firepower, as well as remixes on Atlantic Records, Interscope Records, and RCA Records. Since 2016, Wilson has toured alongside Yellow Claw, Adventure Club, Steve Aoki, Kayzo, Pegboard Nerds, and Excision.

Career
In 2016, Riot Ten released his debut EP Hype Or Die: Headbangerz on Datsik's Firepower Records. The EP included his breakout single "Like Kanye" featuring Trinidadian dancehall artist Bunji Garlin. He went on to sign with Steve Aoki's Dim Mak Records, where he released his now famed dubstep anthem "Rail Breaker".

Discography

Albums 
 Blkmrkt Vol. 1 (2020)
 Hype Or Die: Homecoming (2021)

Extended plays

2018 

Hype or Die: The Dead EP 
Hype or Die: Genesis EP

2019 

Hype or Die: Sun City EP
Hype or Die: Nightmares (album)

Singles

2016 
 "Like Kanye" (featuring Bunji Garlin)
"Hit The Floor" (with Sullivan King)
"F**k It" (with Sullivan King)

2017 
 "Rail Breaker" (featuring Rico Act)
 "Headbusta" (featuring Milano The Don)
 "Scream" (with Sirenz)

2018 
"No Surrender" (featuring Jeff Kush)
"Act A Fool" (with Throwdown featuring Bok Nero)

2019 
 "Glocks" (with Saymyname featuring Milano The Don)
 "Come Back" (with Gentlemens Club)

2020 
 "Lost Your Mind"
 "Ultimate" (with Shaquille O'Neal featuring T-Wayne)
 "Save You" (with Whales featuring Megan Stokes)
 "Wanna Go" (with Charly Jordan)
 "Bang Bang" (with Cesqeaux)
 "Tiktok" (with Blvk Jvck featuring $teve Cannon)
 "Run It" (with Bear Grillz featuring Bok Nero)

2021 
 "Poppin" (with Chrmdrs featuring Krystall Poppin)
 "Get Out" (with Starx featuring Blupill and Dopeboylo)
 "Don't You"
 "Ready For War" (with Dogma featuring Joe Buras)
 "Control" (featuring Add1ction)
 "Ngmf" (with Gammer)
 "Mawlee" (featuring Young Buck and DJ Afterthought)

2022 
 "Bussin Bussin" (with SubDocta featuring JV Rhymes)

Remixes

2018 
 Herobust — "WTF" (Riot Ten Remix)
 Sullivan King — "Begone" (Riot Ten Remix)

2020 
 DJ Snake and Eptic - "Southside" (Riot Ten Remix)
 Modestep - "The Fallout" (Riot Ten Remix)

2022 
 Steve Aoki featuring Miss Palmer - "No Beef" (Riot Ten and Crankdat Remix)

References

1991 births
Living people